Joseph Daniel Laidlaw (12 July 1950 – 18 November 2021) was an English professional footballer who played as a midfielder for six league clubs over a 15-year period spanning three decades.

Career
Laidlaw was born in Whickham and started playing locally for Swalwell before becoming an apprentice at Middlesbrough. He signed his first professional contract in August 1967 and went on to make over 100 appearances for the club. In July 1972 he moved on to begin a four-year stint with Carlisle United before a three-year spell with Billy Bremner's Doncaster Rovers. In June 1979 he moved to Portsmouth for a fee of £15,000. Appointed club captain he quickly became a firm favourite with Portsmouth's fans, the Fratton Faithful. In a memorable roller-coaster first season he led Pompey to promotion, this being achieved on the last day of the season after the club beat Northampton 2–0 and Bradford City lost 1–0 to Peterborough United. The following December Laidlaw was sold to Hereford United for £15,000, his last match having been a 1–0 defeat at Barnsley the preceding month. He played a further 62 league games for The Bulls scoring eight goals before ending his career with a very brief spell at Mansfield Town. After his professional career ended he returned to the south coast to live, and played for Waterlooville before then managing Selsey (initially as player-manager), Fareham Town and Chichester City United

Style of play
A combative player, Laidlaw was one of that generation who bridged the gap between terminological eras, beginning his career as a wing-half and ending it as a midfielder despite playing a similar role throughout.

Death
Laidlaw died on 18 November 2021, at the age of 71.

References

1950 births
2021 deaths
People from Whickham
Footballers from Tyne and Wear
English footballers
Association football midfielders
Middlesbrough F.C. players
Carlisle United F.C. players
Doncaster Rovers F.C. players
Portsmouth F.C. players
Hereford United F.C. players
Mansfield Town F.C. players
Waterlooville F.C. players
English Football League players
Fareham Town F.C. managers
English football managers